Laomedon (Greek: Λαoμέδων ὁ Μυτιληναῖος; lived during the 4th century BC) was a Greek military commander, native of Mytilene and son of Larichus.  He was one of Alexander the Great's generals, and appears to have enjoyed a high place in his confidence even before the death of Philip II, as he was one of those banished by that monarch (together with his brother Erigyius, Ptolemy, Nearchus, and others) for taking part in the intrigues of the young prince. 

After the death of Philip in 336 BC, Laomedon, in common with the others who had suffered on this occasion, was held by Alexander in the highest honour: he accompanied him to Asia, where, on account of his acquaintance with the Persian language, he was appointed in charge of the captives. Though his name is not afterwards mentioned during the wars of Alexander, the high consideration he enjoyed is sufficiently attested by his obtaining in the division of the provinces, after the king's death in 323 BC, the important government of Syria. 

324 B.C. after the death of Alexander, the Macedonian Empire was divided among four of his generals; and Judea being situated between Egypt and Syria, became subject to all the revolutions and wars in which his successors were engaged against each other. it was at first governed by Laomedon, the Mitylenian, one of Alexander captains, and after he was defeated by Ptolemy Soter, King of Egypt, the black Jews refused to violate their engagement to him.{{The history of the Jews from the destruction of Jerusalem to the present time by Hannah Adams page 10-11}}
This he was still allowed to retain on the second partition at Triparadisus in 321 BC, but it was not long before the provinces of Phoenicia and Coele-Syria attracted the interest of his powerful neighbour Ptolemy. The Egyptian king at first offered Laomedon a large sum of money in exchange for his government. When the latter rejected his overtures, he sent Nicanor with an army to invade Syria. 

Laomedon was unable to offer any effective resistance. He was made prisoner by Nicanor and sent to Egypt. However, he managed to escape and joined Alcetas in Pisidia. It is probable that Laomedon took part in the subsequent contest involving Alcetas, Attalus, and the other surviving partisans of Perdiccas against Antigonus, and shared in their final overthrow by Antigonus in 320 BC, but his individual fate is not mentioned.

See also
 Lion of Amphipolis, erected in honour of Laomedon

References
Smith, William (editor); Dictionary of Greek and Roman Biography and Mythology, "Laomedon", Boston, (1867).

Hanna Adams, "History of the Jews: from the destruction of Jerusalem to the present time"

Notes

External links
Pothos.org, Laomedon, son of Larichus

Hetairoi
Generals of Alexander the Great
Satraps of the Alexandrian Empire
Ancient Mytileneans
Settlers in Amphipolis
Trierarchs of Nearchus' fleet
4th-century BC Greek people